Evgeniy Balev Gerganov (born October 1, 1975) is a Bulgarian former professional road cyclist. He represented his nation Bulgaria at the 2008 Summer Olympics.

Career
Born in Sliven, Gerganov qualified for the Bulgarian squad in the men's road race at the 2008 Summer Olympics in Beijing by receiving one half of the team's two berths from UCI Europe Tour. Passing through the 180-km mark, Gerganov could not achieve a best possible result with a severe fatigue under Beijing's intense heat and a lapped violation over the race leader, as he failed to complete a grueling race against a vast field of nearly a hundred cyclists.

Major results

2004
 3rd Time trial, National Road Championships
2005
 3rd Overall International Presidency Turkey Tour
1st Stage 4
2007
 1st Overall Tour of Bulgaria
 2nd Time trial, National Road Championships
 3rd Overall Grand Prix Cycliste de Gemenc
2008
 3rd Time trial, National Road Championships
 8th Overall Tour of Bulgaria
2009
 10th Overall Turul României
2010
 1st Overall Tour of Szeklerland
 5th Road race, National Road Championships
 10th Overall Tour of Bulgaria
1st Stage 7a
2011
 4th Overall Tour of Bulgaria
 5th Overall Tour of Greece
2012
 4th Road race, National Road Championships
2013
 5th Road race, National Road Championships
 9th Overall Tour of Szeklerland
 10th Overall Tour of Bulgaria

References

External links
NBC Olympics Profile

1975 births
Living people
Bulgarian male cyclists
Cyclists at the 2008 Summer Olympics
Olympic cyclists of Bulgaria
Sportspeople from Sliven